Huang Zhangjiayang (born 15 February 2000 Sichuan) is a Chinese rhythmic gymnast. She qualified for the 2020 Summer Olympics, in Women's rhythmic group all-around.

She competed at the 2019 Rhythmic Gymnastics World Championships and the 2020 FIG World Cup.

References

External links 
 (L - R) Hu Yuhui, Xu Yanshu, Liu Xin, Huang Zhangjiayang, Guo Qiqi and Hao Ting of China National Rhythmic Gymnastics Team pose for a portrait ahead of the 2020 Tokyo Olympic Games

2000 births
Living people
Chinese rhythmic gymnasts
Gymnasts at the 2020 Summer Olympics
Olympic gymnasts of China
Sportspeople from Sichuan
21st-century Chinese women